Lori Ann Cardille is an American actress and producer, best known for her role in Day of the Dead (1985).

Career
Cardille's notable television roles were Winter Austen #1 on the ABC soap opera The Edge of Night, and Carol Baker on soap opera Ryan's Hope. Her most notable film role is Sarah in George A. Romero's Day of the Dead.

Writing
She is the author of the book I'm Gonna Tell: ...an Offbeat Tale of Survival, which chronicles her journey after surviving sexual abuse.

Personal life
Cardille is the daughter of Bill Cardille, who acted in George Romero's Night of the Living Dead. She studied acting at Carnegie Mellon University.

Cardille's daughter is actress Kate Rogal. She also has a sister, Marea.

Filmography

Film

Television

References

External links

American film actresses
1954 births
Carnegie Mellon University College of Fine Arts alumni
Living people
Actresses from Pittsburgh